The Doncaster Town Site is an archeological site near Easton, Talbot County, Maryland.  The site is located on one of the earliest land grants in Talbot County, surveyed on October 18, 1658. It is the location of the first Roman Catholic Church erected on the Eastern Shore of Maryland. The town was erected in 1684 and was one of the first planned towns in Maryland. At its peak Doncaster would have contained inns, a chapel, warehouses, a ferry, stores, stocks and a whipping post, a public square, and a number of residences. Archeological deposits were recorded in 1961. 

It was listed on the National Register of Historic Places in 1975.

References

External links
, including photo in 1974, at Maryland Historical Trust website

1684 establishments in Maryland
Archaeological sites in Talbot County, Maryland
Archaeological sites on the National Register of Historic Places in Maryland
Planned communities in the United States
Populated places in colonial Maryland
Catholic Church in Maryland
National Register of Historic Places in Talbot County, Maryland